Nichiren (16 February 1222 – 13 October 1282) was a Japanese Buddhist priest and philosopher of the Kamakura period.

Nichiren declared that the Lotus Sutra alone contains the highest truth of Buddhist teachings suited for the Third Age of Buddhism, insisting that the Sovereign of Japan and its people should  support only this form of Buddhism and eradicate all others.  He advocated the repeated recitation of its title, Nam(u)-myoho-renge-kyo as the only path to Buddhahood and held that Shakyamuni Buddha and all other Buddhist deities  were extraordinary manifestations of a particular Buddha-nature termed Myoho-Renge that is equally accessible to all. He declared that believers of the Sutra must propagate it even under persecution.

Nichiren was a prolific writer and his biography, temperament, and the evolution of his beliefs has been gleaned primarily from his own writings. He claimed the reincarnation of Jōgyō bodhisattva in a past life, and designated six senior disciples, of which the claims to successorship are contested. After his death, he was bestowed the title  by the Emperor Go-Kōgon in 1358 and the title  was conferred posthumously through imperial edict by the Emperor Taisho in 1922.
 
Today, Nichiren Buddhism includes traditional temple schools such as Nichiren-shu sects and Nichiren Shōshū, as well as lay movements such as Soka Gakkai, Risshō Kōsei Kai, Reiyūkai, Kenshōkai, Honmon Butsuryū-shū, Kempon Hokke, and Shōshinkai among many others.

Overview 

The main narrative of Nichiren's life has been constructed from extant letters and treatises he wrote, counted in one collection as 523 complete writings and 248 fragments. Aside from historical documents stored in the repositories of various Nichiren sects, the first extensive non-religious biographical account of Nichiren did not appear until more than 200 years after his death.

He launched his teachings in 1253, advocating an exclusive return to the Lotus Sutra as based on its original Tendai interpretations. His 1260 treatise  argued that a nation that embraces the Lotus Sutra will experience peace and prosperity whereas rulers who support inferior religious teachings invite disorder and disaster into their realms. In a 1264 essay, he stated that the title of the Lotus Sutra, "Nam(u)-myoho-renge-kyo," encompasses all Buddhist teachings and its recitation leads to enlightenment. As a result of his adamant stance, he experienced severe persecution imposed by the Kamakura Shogunate and consequently began to see himself as "bodily reading the Lotus Sutra (Jpn. Hokke shikidoku)." In some of his writings during a second exile (1271–1274) he began to identify himself with the key Lotus Sutra characters Sadāparibhūta and Visistacaritra and saw himself in the role of leading a vast outpouring of Bodhisattvas of the Earth.

In 1274, after his two predictions of foreign invasion and political strife were seemingly actualized by the first attempted Mongol invasion of Japan along with  an unsuccessful coup within the Hōjō clan, Nichiren was pardoned by the Shogunate authorities and his advice was sought but not heeded. The Risshō Ankoku Ron in which he first predicted foreign invasion and civil disorder  is now considered by Japanese historians to be a literary classic illustrating the apprehensions of that period.

Several  hagiographies about Nichiren and are reflected in various pieces of artwork about incidents in his life.

Nichiren remains a controversial figure among scholars who cast him as either a fervent nationalist or a social reformer with a transnational religious vision. Critical scholars have used words such as intolerant, nationalistic, militaristic, and self-righteous to portray him.  On the other hand, Nichiren has been presented as a revolutionary,  a classic reformer, and as a prophet. 
Nichiren is often compared to other religious figures who shared  similar rebellious and revolutionary drives to reform degeneration in their respective societies or schools.

Birth 
According to the lunar Chinese calendar, Nichiren was born on 16th of the second month in 1222, which is 6 April in the Gregorian calendar.

Nichiren was born in the village of Kominato (today part of the city of Kamogawa), Nagase District, Awa Province (within present-day Chiba Prefecture). Accounts of his lineage vary. Nichiren described himself as "the son of a Sendara (Skt: chandala, despised outcast), "a son born of the lowly people living on a rocky strand of the out-of-the-way sea," and "the son of a sea-diver."  In contrast, Hōnen, Shinran, Dōgen, and Eisai, the other founders of religious schools who predated Nichiren, were all born in the Kyoto region and came from noble or samurai backgrounds. Although his writings reflect a fierce pride of his lowly birth, followers after his death began to ascribe to him a more noble lineage, perhaps to attract more adherents.  Some have claimed his father was a rōnin, a manorial functionary (shokan), or a political refugee.

Nichiren's father was Mikuni-no-Tayu Shigetada, also known as Nukina Shigetada Jiro (died 1258); and his mother was Umegiku-nyo (died 1267). On his birth, his parents named him  which has variously been translated into English as "Splendid Sun" and "Virtuous Sun Boy" among others. The exact site of Nichiren's birth is believed to be currently submerged off the shore from present-day  near a temple in Kominato that commemorates his birth.

Buddhist education 
Between the years 1233 and 1253 Nichiren engaged in an intensive study of all of the ten schools of Buddhism prevalent in Japan at that time as well as the Chinese classics and secular literature. During these years, he became convinced of the preeminence of the Lotus Sutra and in 1253 returned to the temple where he first studied to present his findings.

In a 1271 letter Nichiren outlined his rationale for deeply studying Buddhism:

At the age of 12 he began his Buddhist study at a temple of the Tendai school, . He was formally ordained at sixteen years old and took the Buddhist name , Renchō meaning "Lotus Growth." He left Seichō-ji for Kamakura where he studied Pure Land Buddhism, a school that stressed salvation through nianfo (Japanese nembutsu) or the invocation of Amitābha (Japanese Amida), and then studied Zen which had been growing in popularity in both Kamakura and Kyoto. He next traveled to Mount Hiei, the center of Japanese Tendai Buddhism, where he scrutinized the school's original doctrines and its subsequent incorporation of the theories and practices of Pure Land and Esoteric Buddhism. In the final stage of this twenty-year period he traveled to Mount Kōya, the center of Shingon esoteric Buddhism, and to Nara where he studied its six established schools, especially the Ritsu sect which emphasized strict monastic discipline.

Declaration of the Lotus Sutra 
According to one of his letters, Nichiren returned to Seicho-ji Temple on 28 April 1253 to lecture on his twenty years of scholarship. What followed was his first public declaration of Nam(u) Myoho Renge Kyo atop Mount Kiyosumi that same day.  This marked the start of his campaign to return Tendai to the exclusive reliance of the Lotus Sutra and his efforts to convert the entire Japanese nation to this belief.  This declaration also marks the start of his efforts to make profound Buddhist theory practical and actionable so an ordinary person could manifest Buddhahood within his or her own lifetime in the midst of day-to-day realities.

Nichi represents both the light of truth and the sun goddess Amaterasu, symbolizing Japan itself. Ren signifies the Lotus Sutra. Nichiren envisioned Japan as the country where the true teaching of Buddhism would be revived and the starting point for its worldwide spread.

At his lecture, it is construed, Nichiren vehemently attacked Honen, the founder of Pure Land Buddhism, and its practice of chanting the Nembutsu, Nam(u) Amida Butsu. It is likely he also denounced the core teachings of Seicho-ji which had incorporated non-exclusive Lotus Sutra teachings and practices.  In so doing he earned the animosity of the local steward, Hojo Kagenobu, who attempted to have Nichiren killed.  Modern scholarship suggests that events unfolded not in a single day but over a longer period of time and had social, and political dimensions.

Nichiren then developed a base of operation in Kamakura where he converted several Tendai priests, directly ordained others, and attracted lay disciples who were drawn mainly from the strata of the lower and middle samurai class.  Their households provided Nichiren with economic support and became the core of Nichiren communities in several locations in the Kanto region of Japan.

First remonstration to the Kamakura government 

Nichiren arrived in Kamakura in 1254. Between 1254 and 1260 half of the population had perished due to a tragic succession of calamities that included drought, earthquakes, epidemics, famine, fires, and storms.  Nichiren sought scriptural references to explain the unfolding of natural disasters and then wrote a series of works which, based on the Buddhist theory of the non-duality of the human mind and the environment, attributed the sufferings to the weakened spiritual condition of people, thereby causing the Kami (protective forces or traces of the Buddha) to abandon the nation.  The root cause of this, he argued, was the widespread decline of the Dharma due to the mass adoption of the Pure Land teachings.

Nichiren submitted it to Hōjō Tokiyori, the de facto leader of the Kamakura shogunate, as a political move to effectuate radical reform. In it he argued the necessity for "the Sovereign to recognize and accept the singly true and correct form of Buddhism (i.e.) as the only way to achieve peace and prosperity for the land and its people and end their suffering (i.e.)."

Using a dialectic form well-established in China and Japan, the treatise is a 10-segment fictional dialogue between a Buddhist wise man, presumably Nichiren, and a visitor who together lament the tragedies that have beleaguered the nation.  The wise man answers the guest's questions and, after a heated exchange, gradually leads him to enthusiastically embrace the vision of a country grounded firmly on the ideals of the Lotus Sutra. In this writing Nichiren displays a skill in using analogy, anecdote, and detail to persuasively appeal to an individual's unique psychology, experiences, and level of understanding.

The teacher builds his argument by quoting extensively from a set of Buddhist sutras and commentaries. In his future writings Nichiren continued to draw from the same sutras and commentaries, effectively forming Nichiren's canon of sources out of the Buddhist library which he deemed supportive of the Lotus Sutra including the Konkomyo, Daijuku, Ninno, Yakushi, and Nirvana sutras. They share in common apocalyptic or nation-protecting teachings and prophecies.

The Risshō Ankoku Ron concludes with an urgent appeal to the ruler to cease all financial support for Buddhist schools promoting inferior teachings. Otherwise, Nichiren warns, as predicted by the sutras, the continued influence of inferior teachings would invite even more natural disasters as well as the outbreak of civil strife and foreign invasion.

Nichiren submitted his treatise on 16 July 1260 but it drew no official response.  It did, however, prompt a severe backlash from the Buddhist priests of other schools. Nichiren was challenged to a religious debate with leading Kamakura prelates in which, by his account, they were swiftly dispatched. Their lay followers, however, attempted to kill him at his dwelling which forced him to flee Kamakura. His critics had influence with key governmental figures and spread slanderous rumors about him. One year after he submitted the Rissho Ankoku Ron the authorities had him arrested and exiled to the Izu peninsula.

Nichiren's Izu exile lasted two years. In his extant writings from this time period, Nichiren began to strongly draw from chapters 10–22 of the Lotus Sutra, what Tanabe calls its "third realm" (daisan hōmon). Nichiren began to emphasize the purpose of human existence as being the practice of the bodhisattva ideal in the real world which entails undertaking struggle and manifesting endurance. He suggested that he is a model of this behavior, a "votary" (gyōja) of the Lotus Sutra.

Upon being pardoned in 1263 Nichiren returned to Kamakura.  In November 1264 he was ambushed and nearly killed at Komatsubara in Awa Province by a force led by Lord Tōjō Kagenobu. For the next few years he preached in provinces outside of Kamakura but returned in 1268. At this point the Mongols sent envoys to Japan demanding tribute and threatening invasion.  Nichiren sent 11 letters to influential leaders reminding them about his predictions in the Rissho Ankoku Ron.

Attempt at execution 

The threat and execution of Mongol invasion was the worst crisis in pre-modern Japanese history. In 1269 Mongol envoys again arrived to demand Japanese submission to their hegemony and the bakufu responded by  mobilizing military defenses.

The role of Buddhism in "nation-protection" (chingo kokka) was long established in Japan at this time and the government galvanized prayers from Buddhist schools for this purpose.  Nichiren and his followers, however, felt emboldened that the predictions he had made in 1260 of foreign invasion seemingly were being fulfilled and more people joined their movement. Daring a rash response from the bakufu, Nichiren vowed in letters to his followers that he was giving his life to actualize the Lotus Sutra. He accelerated his polemics against the non-Lotus teachings the government had been patronizing at the very time it was attempting to solidify national unity and resolve.  In a series of letters to prominent leaders he directly provoked the major prelates of Kamakura temples that the Hojo family patronized, criticized the principles of Zen which was popular among the samurai class, critiqued the esoteric practices of Shingon just as the government was invoking them, and condemned the ideas underlying Risshū as it was enjoying a revival. His actions at that time have been described by modern scholars either as a high form of altruism or the ravings of a fanatic and madman.

His claims drew the ire of the influential religious figures of the time and their followers, especially the Shingon priest . Nichiren considered this as his second remonstration to the government.

According to Nichiren's own account, he was sentenced to exile but was brought to Tatsunukuchi beach in Shichirigahama for execution. At the final moment an astronomical phenomenon, "a brilliant orb as bright as the moon," arced over the execution grounds, terrifying Nichiren's executioners into inaction. Some scholars have proposed alternative narratives for this story.

Regardless of the account, Nichiren's life was spared and he was exiled to Sado Island. The incident has become known as the "Tatsunokuchi Persecution" and was regarded by Nichiren as a death-and-resurrection turning point.

Second banishment and exile 

After the failed execution authorities carried out Nichiren's original sentence of exile to Sado Island in the Sea of Japan. Upon arriving, he was dispatched to a small dilapidated temple located in a graveyard. Nichiren was accompanied by a few disciples and in the first winter they endured terrible cold, food deprivation, and threats from local inhabitants.
 
Nichiren scholars describe a clear shift in both tone and message in letters written before his Sado exile and those written during and after.  Initially, Nichiren's urgent concern was to rally his followers in Kamakura.  The tactics of the bakufu suppression of the Nichiren community included exile, imprisonment, land confiscation, or ousting from clan membership.  Apparently a majority of his disciples abandoned their faith and others questioned why they and Nichiren were facing such adversity in light of the Lotus Sutra's promise of "peace and security in the present life."

In response he began to identify himself with Sadāparibhūta, a key figure in the Lotus Sutra, who in the 20th chapter invited repeated persecution in his efforts to propagate the sutra. Such hardship, Nichiren argued, fulfilled and validated the Lotus Sutra. He also identified himself with the bodhisattva Visistacaritra to whom Shakyamuni entrusted the future propagation of the Lotus Sutra, seeing himself in the role of leading a vast outpouring of Bodhisattvas of the Earth who pledged to liberate the oppressed.

In the latter he stated that facing adversity should be regarded as a matter of course and that the resolve to carry on with the mission to propagate the sutra was for him more important than guarantees of protection: "Let Heaven forsake me. Let ordeals confront me. I will not begrudge bodily life... . No matter what trials we may encounter, so long as we do not have a mind of doubt, I and my disciples will naturally achieve the Buddha realm." He concluded this work with the vow to be the "pillar of Japan, the eyes of Japan, the great ship of Japan."

The Mandala Gohonzon

At the end of the 1271–1272 winter Nichiren's conditions had improved.  He had attracted a small band of followers in Sado who provided him with support and disciples from the mainland began visiting him and providing supplies. In 1272 there was an attempted coup in Kamakura and Kyoto, seemingly fulfilling the prediction he had made in the Rissho Ankoku Ron of rebellion in the domain.  At this point Nichiren was transferred to much better accommodations.

While on Sado island, Nichiren inscribed the first Mandala . Although there is evidence of a Gohonzon in embryonic form as far back as the days right before his exile, the first in full form is dated to 8 July 1273 and includes the inscription of "Nichiren inscribes this for the first time."

His writings on Sado provide his rationale for a calligraphic mandala depicting the assembly at Eagle Peak which was to be used as an object of devotion or worship.  By increasingly associating himself with Visistacaritra he implied a direct link to the original and universal Buddha. He read in the 16th (Life span) chapter of the Lotus Sutra a three-fold "secret Dharma" of the daimoku, the object of worship (honzon), and the ordination platform (kaidan).  These became the means for people to directly access the Buddha's enlightenment.

At the bottom of each mandala he wrote: "This is the great mandala never before revealed in Jambudvipa during the more than 2,200 years since the Buddha's nirvana."  He inscribed many Mandala Gohonzon during the rest of his life. More than a hundred Mandala Gohonzon preserved today are attributed to Nichiren's own hand.

Return to Kamakura 
Nichiren was pardoned on 14 February 1274 and returned to Kamakura one month later on 26 March. Nichiren wrote that his innocence and the accuracy of his predictions caused the regent Hōjō Tokimune to intercede on his behalf.  Scholars have suggested that some of his well-connected followers might have had influence on the government's decision to release him.

On 8 April he was summoned by Hei no Saemon, who inquired about the timing of the next Mongol invasion. Nichiren predicted that it would occur within the year. He used the audience as yet another opportunity to remonstrate with the government.  Claiming that reliance on prayers based on esoteric rituals would invite further calamity, he urged the bakufu to ground itself exclusively on the Lotus Sutra.

Deeply disappointed by the government's refusal to heed his advice, Nichiren left Kamakura one month later, on 12 May, determined to become a solitary wayfarer.  Five days later, however, on a visit to the residence of Lord Hakii Sanenaga of Mt. Minobu, he learned that followers in nearby regions had held steadfast during his exile.  Despite severe weather and deprivation, Nichiren remained in Minobu for the rest of his career.

Retirement to Mount Minobu 
During his self-imposed exile at Mount Minobu, a location 100 miles west of Kamakura, Nichiren led a widespread movement of followers in Kanto and Sado mainly through his prolific letter-writing. During the so-called "Atsuhara affair" of 1279 when governmental attacks were aimed at Nichiren's followers rather than himself, Nichiren's letters reveal an assertive and well-informed leader who provided detailed instructions through a sophisticated network of disciples serving as liaisons between Minobu and other affected areas in Japan.  He also showed the ability to provide a compelling narrative of events that gave his followers a broad perspective of what was unfolding.

More than half of the extant letters of Nichiren were written during his years at Minobu. Some consisted of moving letters to followers expressing appreciation for their assistance, counseling on personal matters, and explaining his teachings in more understandable terms.

During his years at Minobu Nichiren intensified his attacks on  that had been incorporated into the Japanese Tendai school. It becomes clear at this point that he understood that he was creating his own form of Lotus Buddhism.

In the 19th century this structure burned down to be replaced by a new structure completed in the second half of the Meiji era.

While at Minobu Nichiren also inscribed numerous Mandala Gohonzon for bestowal upon specific disciples and lay believers. Nichiren Shoshu believers claim that after the execution of the three Atsuhara farmers he inscribed the Dai Gohonzon on 12 October 1279, a Gohonzon specifically addressed to all humanity. This assertion  has been disputed by other schools as historically and textually incorrect. It is enshrined currently at the Tahō Fuji Dai-Nichirenge-Zan Taiseki-ji, informally known as the Head Temple Taiseki-ji of the Nichiren Shōshū Order of Buddhism, located at the foot of Mount Fuji in Fujinomiya, Shizuoka. Several of these Mandala Gohonzon are prominently retained by the Nichiren-shū in Yamanashi Prefecture.

It is apparent that Nichiren took great care in deciding which of his disciples were eligible to receive a Gohonzon inscribed by him. In the case of a letter written to Lady Niiama he took great care to explain why he would not inscribe a Gohonzon despite a deep personal bond.  Among the Gohonzon he inscribed were several that were quite large and perhaps intended for congregational use in chapels maintained by some lay followers.

Death 

In 1282, after years of seclusion, Nichiren fell ill. His followers encouraged him to travel to the hot springs in Hitachi for their medicinal benefits. He was also encouraged by his disciples to travel there for the warmer weather, and to use the land offered by Hagiri Sanenaga for recuperation.  En route, unable to travel further, he stopped at the home of a disciple in Ikegami, outside of present-day Tokyo, and died on 13 October  1282. According to legend, he died in the presence of fellow disciples after having spent several days lecturing from his sickbed on the Lotus Sutra, writing a final letter, and leaving instructions for the future of his movement after his death, namely the designation of the six senior disciples. His funeral and cremation took place the following day.

His disciples left Ikegami with Nichiren's ashes on 21 October, reaching back to Minobu on 25 October.

 Nichiren Shu sects claims his tomb is sited, as per his request, at Kuon-ji on Mount Minobu where his ashes remain.
 Nichiren Shoshu asserts that Nikko Shonin later confiscated his cremated ashes along with other articles and brought them to Mount Fuji which, they claim are now enshrined on the left side next to the Dai Gohonzon within the Hoando storage house.

Teachings 
Nichiren's teachings developed over the course of his career and their evolution can be seen through the study of his writings as well as in the annotations he made in his personal copy of the Lotus Sutra, the so-called Chū-hokekyō.

Some scholars set a clear demarcation in his teachings at the time he arrived at Sado Island whereas others see a threefold division of thought: up to and through the Izu exile, from his return to Kamakura through the Sado Island exile, and during his years at Minobu.

According to Anesaki, Nichiren, upon his arrival at Minobu, quickly turned his attention to consolidating his teachings toward their perpetuation. The scope of his thinking was outlined in an essay , considered by Nikkō Shōnin as one of Nichiren's ten major writings.

Anesaki also claims that later during his Minobu years, in lectures he is said to have transmitted to his disciples, Nichiren summarized the key ideas of his teachings in one paragraph: Buddhahood is eternal, all people can and should manifest it in their lives; Nichiren is the personage in the Lotus Sutra whose mission it is to enable people to realize their enlightenment; his followers who share his vow are the Bodhisattvas of the Earth. This requires a spiritual and moral unity among followers based on their inherent Buddhahood; Nichiren established the seeds of this community and his followers to come must extend it globally. Thus the enlightened individual, country, and world are different expressions of the ideal of the Buddha land; and the enlightened heart of the individual plays out its role with the world and cosmos as its stage. This is Nichiren's vision of Kosen-rufu, a time when the teachings of the Lotus Sutra would be widely spread throughout the world.

Nichiren set a precedent for Buddhist social activism centuries before its emergence in other Buddhist schools.  The uniqueness of his teachings was his attempt to move Buddhism from the theoretical to the actualizable. He held adamantly that his teachings would permit a nation to right itself and ultimately lead to world peace.

Some of his religious thinking was derived from the Tendai understanding of the Lotus Sutra, syncretic beliefs that were deeply rooted in the culture of his times, and new perspectives that were products of Kamakura Buddhism.  Other ideas were completely original and unique to him.

Contributions based on Tendai or contemporary thought 
Nichiren was a product of his times and some of his teachings were drawn from existing schools of thought or from emerging ideas in Kamakura Buddhism. Nichiren appropriated and expanded on these ideas.

Immanence 
Nichiren stressed the concept of immanence, meaning that the Buddha's pure land is to be found in this present world (shaba soku jakkōdo). Related concepts such as attaining enlightenment in one's current form (sokushin jōbutsu) and the belief that enlightenment is not attained but is originally existing within all people (hongaku) had been introduced by Kūkai and Saicho several centuries earlier.  These concepts were based on Chih-i's cosmology of the unity and interconnectedness of the universe called Three Thousand Realms in a Single Moment of Life (ichinen sanzen).

Nichiren advanced these concepts by declaring that they were actualizable rather than theoretical.  Cause and effect were simultaneous instead of linear. Contemplation of one's mind (kanjin) took place within the singular belief in and commitment to the Lotus Sutra.  According to Nichiren these phenomena manifest when a person chants the title of the Lotus Sutra (date) and shares its validity with others, even at the cost of one's life if need be.

Nichiren constructed a triad relationship between faith, practice, and study.  Faith meant embracing his new paradigm of the Lotus Sutra.  It was something that needed to be continually deepened.  "To accept (ju) [faith in the sutra] is easy," he explained to a follower, "to uphold it (ji) is difficult.  But the realization of Buddhahood lies in upholding [faith]."  This could only be manifested by the practice of chanting the daimoku as well as teaching others to do the same, and study.

Consequently, Nichiren consistently and vehemently objected to the perspective of the Pure Land school that stressed an other-worldly aspiration to some pure land. Behind his assertion is the concept of the nonduality of the subjective realm (the individual) and the objective realm (the land that the individual inhabits) which indicates that when the individual taps buddhahood, his or her present world becomes peaceful and harmonious. For Nichiren the widespread propagation of the Lotus Sutra and consequent world peace ("kosen-rufu") was achievable and inevitable and tasked his future followers with a mandate to accomplish it.

The Latter Day of the Law 
The Kamakura period of 13th century Japan was characterized by a sense of foreboding. Nichiren, as well as the others of this time, believed that they had entered the Latter Day of the Law (Mappō), the time which Shakyamuni predicted his teachings would lose their efficacy. Indeed, Japan had entered an era of extreme natural disasters, internal strife and political conflict.

Although Nichiren attributed the turmoils and disasters in society to the widespread practice of what he deemed inferior Buddhist teachings that were under government sponsorship, he was enthusiastically upbeat about the portent of the age. He asserted, in contrast to other Mahayana schools, this was the best possible moment to be alive, the era in which the Lotus Sutra was to spread, and the time in which the Bodhisattvas of the Earth would appear to propagate it. "It is better to be a leper who chants Nam(u)-myōhō-renge-kyō than be a chief abbot of the Tendai school."

Debate and polemics 
The tradition of conducting open and sustained debate to clarify matters of fundamental Buddhist principles has deep-seated roots in Tibet, China, and Korea. This tradition was also quite pronounced in Japan.

In addition to formalized religious debates, the Kamakura period was marked by flourishing and competitive oral religious discourse. Temples began to compete for the patronage of the wealthy and powerful through oratorical sermonizing and temple lecturers (kōshi) faced pressure to attract crowds.  Sermonizing spread from within the confines of temples to homes and the streets as wandering mendicants (shidōso, hijiri, or inja) preached to both the educated and illiterate in exchange for alms.  In order to teach principles of faith preachers incorporated colorful storytelling, music, vaudeville, and drama—which later evolved into Noh.

A predominant topic of debate in Kamakura Buddhism was the concept of rebuking "slander of the Dharma." The Lotus Sutra itself strongly warns about slander of the Dharma. His ideas were vociferously attacked by many including Nichiren.

Nichiren, however, elevated countering slander of the Dharma into a pillar of Buddhist practice. In fact, far more of his extant writings deal with the clarification of what constitutes the essence of Buddhist teachings than expositions of how to meditate.

At age 32, Nichiren began a career of denouncing other Mahayana Buddhist schools of his time and declaring what he asserted was the correct teaching, the Universal Dharma (Nam(u)-Myōhō-Renge-Kyō), and chanting its words as the only path for both personal and social salvation. The first target of his polemics was Pure Land Buddhism which had begun to gain ascendancy among the leaders and populace and even had established itself within the Tendai school. Nichiren's detailed rationale is most famously articulated in his : "Treatise On Establishing the Correct Teaching for the Peace of the Land," his first major treatise and the first of his three remonstrations with the bakufu authorities.

Although his times were harsh and permeated by bakufu culture, Nichiren always chose the power of language over bearing arms or resorting to violence.  He didn't mince his words and was relentless to pursue dialogue whether in the form of debate, conversations, or correspondence. His spirit of engaging in discourse is captured in his statement, "Whatever obstacles I may encounter, as long as men [persons] of wisdom do not prove my teachings to be false, I will never yield."

"Single Practice" Buddhism 
Hōnen introduced the concept of "single practice" Buddhism.  Basing himself on the writings of the Chinese Buddhist Shandao, he advocated the singular practice of Nianfo, the recitation of the Buddha Amida's name. This practice was revolutionary because it was accessible to all and minimalized the monopolistic role of the entire monastic establishment.

Nichiren appropriated the structure of a universally accessible single practice but substituted the Nianfo with the daimoku of Nam(u)-myōhō-renge-kyō. This constituted renouncing the principle of aspiring to a Pure Land after death and asserting instead the Lotus perspective of attaining Buddhahood in one's present form in this lifetime.

Protective forces 
Japan had a long-established system of folk beliefs that existed outside of and parallel to the schools of the Buddhist establishment. Many of these beliefs had an influence on the various religious schools which, in turn, influenced each other, a phenomenon known as syncretism. Among these beliefs were the existence of kami, indigenous gods and goddesses or protective forces, that influenced human and natural occurrences in a holistic universe. Some beliefs ascribed kami to traces of the Buddha. The belief in kami was deeply embedded in the episteme of the time. Human agency through prayers and rituals could summon forth kami who would engage in nation-protection (chingo kokka).

According to some of his accounts, Nichiren undertook his study of Buddhism to largely understand why the kami had seemingly abandoned Japan, as witnessed by the decline of the imperial court.  Because the court and the people had turned to teachings that had weakened their minds and resolve, he came to conclude, both people of wisdom and the protective forces had abandoned the nation.

By extension, he argued, through proper prayer and action his troubled society would transform into an ideal world in which peace and wisdom prevail and "the wind will not thrash the branches nor the rain fall hard enough to break clods."

Unique teachings 
From Nichiren's corpus appear several lines of unique Buddhist thought.

"The Five Guides of Propagation"  
Developed during his Izu exile, the Five Guides (gogi) are five criteria through which Buddhist teachings can be evaluated and ranked. They are the quality of the teaching (kyō), the innate human capacity (ki) of the people, the time (ji), the characteristic of the land or country (koku), and the sequence of dharma propagation (kyōhō rufu no zengo). From these five interrelated perspectives Nichiren declared his interpretation of the Lotus Sutra as the supreme teaching.

The Four Denunciations 
Throughout his career Nichiren harshly denounced Buddhist practices other than his own as well as the existing social and political system.  The tactic he adopted was shakubuku, conversion, in which he shocked his adversaries with his denunciations while attracting followers through his outward display of supreme confidence.  Modern detractors criticize his exclusivist single-truth perspective as intolerant. Apologists argue his arguments should be understood in the context of his samurai society and not through post-modern lenses such as tolerance. Both of them may be regarded as having seized an aspect of the truth, namely that Nichiren, rather like Dogen, was not less brilliantly original for being a rigid dogmatist in doctrine.

As his career advanced, Nichiren's vehement polemics against Pure Land teachings came to include sharp criticisms of the Shingon, Zen, and Ritsu schools of Buddhism.  Collectively his criticisms have become known as "the Four Denunciations." Later in his career he critiqued the Japanese Tendai school for its appropriation of Shingon elements. Reliance on Shingon rituals, he claimed, was magic and would decay the nation.  He held that Zen was devilish in its belief that attaining enlightenment was possible without relying on the Buddha's words; Ritsu was thievery because it hid behind token deeds such as public works. In modern parlance the Four Denunciations rebuked thinking that demoralized and disengaged people by encouraging resignation and escapism.

The doctrine of the Three Great Secret Laws 
Nichiren deemed the world to be in a degenerative age and believed that people required a simple and effective means to rediscover the core of Buddhism and thereby restore their spirits and times.  He described his Three Great Secret Laws (Sandai hiho) as this very means.

In a writing entitled Sandai Hiho Sho, or "On the Transmission of the Three Great Secret Laws", Nichiren delineated three teachings in the heart of the 16th chapter of the Lotus Sutra which are secret because he claimed he received them as the leader of the Bodhisattvas of the Earth through a silent transmission from Shakyamuni.  They are the invocation (daimoku), the object of worship (honzon), and the platform of ordination or place of worship (kaidan).

The daimoku, the rhythmic chanting of Nam(u)-myōhō-renge-kyō is the means to discover that one's own life, the lives of others, and the environment is the essence of the Buddha of absolute freedom.  The chanting is to be done while contemplating the honzon.  At the age of 51, Nichiren inscribed his own Mandala Gohonzon, the object of veneration or worship in his Buddhism, "never before known," as he described it. The Gohonzon is a calligraphic representation of the cosmos and chanting daimoku to it is Nichiren's method of meditation to experience the truth of Buddhism.  He believed this practice was efficacious, simple to perform, and suited to the capacity of the people and the time.

Nichiren describes the first two secret laws in numerous other writings but the reference to the platform of ordination appears only in the Sandai Hiho Sho, a work whose authenticity has been questioned by some scholars. Nichiren apparently left the fulfillment of this secret Dharma to his successors and its interpretation has been a matter of heated debate. Some state that it refers to the construction of a physical national ordination platform sanctioned by the emperor; others contend that the ordination platform is the community of believers (sangha) or, simply, the place where practitioners of the Lotus Sutra live and make collective efforts to realize the ideal of establishing the true Dharma in order to establish peace to the land (rissho ankoku). The latter conception entails a robust interplay between religion and secular life and an egalitarian structure in which people are dedicated to perfecting an ideal society.

According to Nichiren, practicing the Three Secret Laws results in the "Three Proofs" which verify their validity.  The first proof is "documentary," whether the religion's fundamental texts, here the writings of Nichiren, make a lucid case for the eminence of the religion.  "Theoretical proof" is an intellectual standard of whether a religion's teachings reasonably clarify the mysteries of life and death.  "Actual proof," deemed the most important by Nichiren, demonstrates the validity of the teaching through the actual improvements achieved by practitioners in their daily lives.

Changing karma to mission 
Nichiren was deeply aware of the karmic struggles his followers faced in their day-to-day existence and assured them that they could "cross the sea of suffering" (Shiji Shiro-dono gosho). Through prevailing over such challenges, he taught, they would establish a sense of inner freedom, peace of mind, and understanding of the Dharma that persisted independent of the ups and downs of sentient existence.  He accepted prevailing Buddhist notions about karma that taught that a person's current conditions were the cumulative effect of past thoughts, words, and actions. He showed little concern, however, for attributing current circumstances to supposed past deeds.  Rather, he viewed karma through the lens of the teachings of the Lotus Sutra which could enable all people to become Buddhas, even the ignorant and evil people of the Latter Day of the Law.

When confronting karmic situations, the act of chanting Nam(u)-myoho-renge-kyo would open the wisdom of the Buddha, transforming karma into mission and a creative and joy-filled way of life.  Beyond the sphere of a single individual's life, the process would awaken a person's concern for the broader society and sense of social responsibility.

Nichiren introduced the term  to describe himself. The Lotus Sutra itself speaks of the great trials that will be faced by individuals who base themselves on its teachings and attempt to spread it. Nichiren claims he read the sutra "bodily" (shikidoku),  voluntarily inviting the entailing hardships it predicts rather than just reciting or meditating on its words.

Through challenging these persecutions Nichiren claimed to have discovered his personal mission and felt great joy even when experiencing the harshness of exile.  His sufferings became, in his thinking, redemptive opportunities to change his karma and give his life transcendent meaning.

In enduring severe persecutions Nichiren claimed that the negative karma he had accumulated from the past could be eradicated quickly in his current life.  He was an active agent in this process, not a victim.  He even expressed appreciation to his tormentors for giving him the opportunity to serve as an envoy of the Buddha.
 
In letters to some of his followers Nichiren extended the concept of meeting persecution for the sake of propagating the Dharma to experiencing tribulations in life such as problems with family discord or illness.  He encouraged these followers to take ownership of such life events, view them as opportunities to repay karmic debts and mitigate them in shorter periods of time than would otherwise be the case. Naturally, he did not use language redolent of twentieth century concepts within, e.g., psychotherapy, hyperliberalism or the Human Potential Movement, but his insistence on personal responsibility can be reimagined in such terms.

Nichiren reached a state of conviction that offered a new perspective on karma.  He express that his resolve to carry out his mission was paramount in importance and that the Lotus Sutra's promise of a peaceful and secure existence meant finding joy and validation in the process of overcoming karma. According to Stone, in confronting karma Nichiren "demonstrated an attitude that wastes little energy in railing against it but unflinchingly embraces it, interpreting it in whatever way appears meaningful at the moment so as to use that suffering for one's own development and to offer it on behalf of others."

The great vow to achieve Kosen-rufu 
Nichiren's teachings are replete with vows he makes for himself and asks his followers to share as well. Some are personal in nature such as frequent admonitions for people to transform their inner lives. "You must quickly reform the tenets you hold in your heart," he stated in his treatise Rissho Ankoku Ron. He urged his followers to attain "treasures of the heart" and to reflect on their behavior as human beings. These vows are "this-worldly" rather than theoretical and are matched with an easily accessible practice.

Nichiren also made a "great vow" of a political dimension. He and his followers to come would create the conditions that lead to a just nation and world which the Lotus Sutra describes as Kosen-rufu. Nichiren's teachings, however, fully embraced a newly emerging viewpoint in medieval Japan that "nation" referred to the land and the people. Nichiren was unique among his contemporaries in charging the actual government in power, in this case the bakufu rather than the throne, with the peace of the land as well as the thriving of the Dharma. In his teachings based on the Lotus Sutra, all human beings are equal, whether the nation's sovereign or an unknown commoner. Enlightenment is not restricted to an individual'

s inner life but is actualized by efforts toward the transformation of the land and the realization of an ideal society.

This entails an urgent mandate. Nichiren links the great vow of personages in the Lotus Sutra to raise all people to the consciousness of the Buddha, to his own single-minded struggles to teach the Law despite the great persecutions he, Nichiren himself, encountered, to his injunction to future disciples to create the Buddha land in the saha world over the course of the myriad years to follow.

Nichiren and his followers 

Nichiren was a charismatic leader who attracted many followers during both his missionary trips and his exiles.  Most of these followers were warriors and feudal lords. He maintained to his women followers that they were equally able to attain enlightenment. He set a high standard of leadership and, in his writings, shared his rationale and strategies with them, openly urging them to share his conviction and struggles.

He left the fulfillment of the kaidan, the third of his Three Secret Dharmas, to his disciples.  His many extant letters demonstrate the scope and breadth of his relationship with them and his expectations for them.  They recognized and trusted his charismatic leadership and his understanding of Buddhism.  Many sought his guidance to overcome personal problems.  Many were actively involved with supporting him financially and protecting his community of followers.  Several of disciples were praised by him for sharing in his privations and a few lost their lives in these situations.  Although over the centuries the movement he established was fraught with divisions, his followers sustained his teachings and example and various times gained considerable influence.  Today his followers are found in influential lay movements as well as traditional Nichiren schools.

The relationship between Nichiren and his disciples has been called shitei funi, the oneness of mentor and disciple.  Although the functions of the mentor and disciple may vary, they share the same goals and the same responsibility. Nichiren claimed the precedent for shitei funi is a core theme of the Lotus Sutra, especially in chapters 21 and 22 where the Buddha entrusts the future propagation of the sutra to the gathered bodhisattvas.

After Nichiren's death 
After Nichiren's death, his teachings were interpreted in different ways. As a result, Nichiren Buddhism encompasses several major branches and schools, each with its own doctrine and set of interpretations of Nichiren's teachings.

Writings 

Many of Nichiren's writings still exist in his original handwriting, some as complete works and some as fragments. Other documents survive as copies made by his immediate disciples. Nichiren's existing works number over 700 manuscripts in total, including transcriptions of orally delivered lectures, letters of remonstration and illustrations.

Scholars have divided the writings attributed to Nichiren into three categories: those whose authenticity are universally accepted, those generally designated as written by someone else after his death, and a third category in which the veracity of works is still being debated.

In addition to treatises written in  formal , Nichiren also wrote expositories and letters to followers in mixed kanji-kana vernacular as well as letters in simplified kana for believers such as children who could not read the more formal styles.  Some of Nichiren's kanbun works, especially the Risshō Ankoku Ron, are considered exemplary of the  kanbun style, while many of his letters show unusual empathy and understanding for the downtrodden of his day.

Selected important writings 
Among his kanbun treatises, five are generally accepted by Nichiren schools as his major works:

 On Securing the Peace of the Land through the Propagation of True Buddhism (Rissho Ankoku Ron) — written between 1258 and 1260.
 The Opening of the Eyes (Kaimoku-sho) — written in 1272.
 The True Object of Worship (Kanjin-no Honzon-sho) — written in 1273.
 The Selection of the Time (Senji-sho) — written in 1275.
 On Repaying Debts of Gratitude (Ho'on-sho) — written in 1276.

Nichiren Shōshū adds an additional five writings to comprise a set of ten major writings. Other Nichiren sects dispute these selections as being either of secondary importance or as apocryphal:

 On Chanting the Daimoku of the Lotus Sutra (Sho-hokke Daimoku-sho) — Written in 1260.
 On Taking the Essence of the Lotus Sutra (Hokke Shuyo-sho) — written in 1274.
 On the Four Stages of Faith and the Five Stages of Practice (Shishin Gohon-sho) — written in 1277.
 Letter to Shimoyama (Shimoyama Gosho-soku) — written in 1277.
 Questions and Answers on the Object of Worship (Honzon Mondo-sho) —  written in 1278.

Personal letters to followers 
Among the collection of his extant writings are numerous letters to his follows in the form of thank you notes, messages of condolence, responses to questions, and spiritual counseling for trying moments in his followers' lives. Collectively these letters demonstrate that Nichiren was a master of providing both comfort and challenge befitting the unique personalities and situations of each individual.

Many of these letters use tales drawn from Indian, Chinese, and Japanese traditions as well as historical anecdotes and stories from the Buddhist canon. Nichiren incorporated several hundred of these anecdotes and took liberty to freely embellish some of them; a few of the stories he provided do not appear in other collections and could be original.

Another category of his letters follow the genres of Japanese zuihitsu, lyrical and loosely organized essays that combine personal reflection and poetic language, or personal diaries (nikki) Nichiren was a master of this genre and these colloquial works reveal his highly personal and charismatic method of proselytization as well as his deep caring for his followers.

Nichiren used his letters as a means to inspire key supporters.  About one hundred followers are identified as recipients and several received between 5 and 20 of them.  The recipients tended to be of the warrior class and only scattered references appear about his lower status followers, many of whom were illiterate. The series of letters he wrote his followers during the "Atsuhara affair" of 1279 provide a case study of how he used personal written communications to direct a response to the government's actions and to keep his followers steadfast during the ordeal.

Writings to women 
Against a backdrop of earlier Buddhist teachings that deny the possibility of enlightenment to women or reserve that possibility for life after death, Nichiren is highly sympathetic to women. Based on various passages from the Lotus Sutra, Nichiren asserts that "Other sutras are written for men only.  This sutra is for everyone."

Ninety of his extant letters, nearly a fifth of the total, were addressed to female correspondents.  Nichiren Shu  published separate volumes of those writings.

In these letters Nichiren plays particular attention to the instantaneous attainment of enlightenment of the Dragon King's daughter in the "Devadatta" (Twelfth) chapter of the Lotus Sutra and displays deep concern for the fears and worries of his female disciples.

In many of his letters to female believers he often expressed compliments for their in-depth questions about Buddhism while encouraging them in their efforts to attain enlightenment in this lifetime.

Sword associated to Nichiren
The "Juzumaru-Tsunetsugu"  is a katana sword associated with Nichiren. The sword was given to Nichiren by lay follower Nanbu Sanenaga for protection. Nichiren did not use the sword, rather held it as a symbol for the “destroying of iniquity and establishing righteousness” and placed a juzu rosary on its hilt, thus giving the sword its accorded name.

The 13th century swordsmith Aoe Tsunetsugu is credited with creating the Juzumaru-Tsunetsugu. However, scholarship research shows the Juzumaru shows variations and differences in its workmanship compared to other authenticated Aoe Tsunetsugu swords. For example, the artisan signature on the Juzumaru is on the other side of where Aoe would have typically signed his swords. Debate on its origin of craftsmanship is contested regarding the sword.

Notes

References

Bibliography 
 
 
 
 
 
 
 
 
 
 
 
 The English Buddhist Dictionary Committee (2002). The Soka Gakkai Dictionary of Buddhism., Tokyo, Soka Gakkai,

English translations of Nichiren's writings 
  The Major Writings of Nichiren. Soka Gakkai, Tokyo, 1999.
 Heisei Shimpen Dai-Nichiren Gosho (平成新編　大日蓮御書: "Heisei new compilation of Nichiren's writings"), Taisekiji, 1994.
 The Writings of Nichiren, Volume I, Burton Watson and the Gosho Translation Committee. Soka Gakkai, 2006, .
 The Writings of Nichiren, Volume II, Burton Watson and the Gosho Translation Committee. Soka Gakkai, 2006, .
 The Record of the Orally Transmitted Teachings, Burton Watson, trans. Soka Gakkai, 2005, .
 Writings of Nichiren, Chicago, Middleway Press, 2013, The Opening of the Eyes.
 Writings of Nichiren, Doctrine 1, University of Hawai'i Press, 2003, .
 Writings of Nichiren, Doctrine 2, University of Hawai'i Press, 2002, .
 Writings of Nichiren, Doctrine 3, University of Hawai'i Press, 2004, .
 Writings of Nichiren, Doctrine 4, University of Hawai'i Press, 2007, .
 Writings of Nichiren, Doctrine 5, University of Hawai'i Press, 2008, .
 Writings of Nichiren, Doctrine 6, University of Hawai'i Press, 2010, .
 Letters of Nichiren, Burton Watson et al., trans.; Philip B. Yampolsky, ed. Columbia University Press, 1996 .
 Selected Writings of Nichiren, Burton Watson et al., trans.; Philip B. Yampolsky, ed. Columbia University, Press, 1990,.

See also
Nichiren, 1979 Japanese film starring Kinnosuke Yorozuya as Nichiren.

External links 

 Life of Nichiren by Ryuei Michael McCormick
 Renso Den, An Illustrated Life Story of Nichiren  with pictures by K. Touko1920
 An English biography of Nichiren on the website of the Myokanko, a Japanese group associated with Nichiren Shoshu
 life of Nichiren – Soka Gakkai International (SGI) Website
 Official Nichiren Shoshu Website
 Official Nichiren Shu Website
 Official Nichiren Buddhist Association of America Website
 Nichiren Secular
 Nichiren – a Man of Many Miracles (日蓮と蒙古大襲来 Nichiren to mōko daishūrai) – 1958 film by Kunio Watanabe.

 
1222 births
1282 deaths
13th-century Buddhists
13th-century clergy
13th-century Japanese people
Buddhas
Buddhism articles needing expert attention
Founders of Buddhist sects
Japanese religious leaders
Kamakura period Buddhist clergy

People from Chiba Prefecture
Recipients of Japanese royal pardons